Miss America 1948, the 22nd Miss America pageant, was held at the Boardwalk Hall in Atlantic City, New Jersey on September 11, 1948.

The winner, BeBe Shopp, was the first Miss Minnesota to take the crown. Shopp performed a song on a Vibraharp during the talent competition. Later in life, she became an Episcopalian minister.

Third runner-up, Miss Kansas, Vera J. Ralston, and another finalist, representing Chicago, Lois Nettleton, went on to become a successful Hollywood actress.

Results

Awards

Preliminary awards

Other awards

Contestants

References

Secondary sources

External links
 Miss America official website

1948
1948 beauty pageants
1948 in the United States
1948 in New Jersey
September 1948 events in the United States
Events in Atlantic City, New Jersey